Shahdadkot railway station is a station on the Larkana–Jacobabad Light Railway line in Pakistan.

See also
 List of railway stations in Pakistan
 Pakistan Railways

References

External links

Railway stations in Qambar Shahdadkot District
Railway stations on Larkana–Jacobabad line